A boulevard is a type of road, typically a wider more formal road.

Boulevard may also refer to:

Films
 Boulevard (1960 film), French drama
 Boulevard (1994 film), American thriller
 Boulevard (2014 film), a 2014 film directed by Dito Montiel

Magazines
 Boulevard (New York-based magazine), about the Gold Coast area of Long Island, NY, formerly The Boulevard, founded 1985
 Boulevard (magazine), an American literary magazine, founded 1985
 Le Boulevard (Paris), French magazine, 1861-1863

Music
 Boulevard (Murray McLauchlan album), 1976
 Boulevard (St. Germain album), 1995
 "Boulevard" (song), single from Jackson Browne's 1980 album, Hold Out
 Boulevard (Canadian band), Canadian rock band, 1980s – early '90s, 2014 – present
 Boulevard (Finnish band), a Finnish rock band founded in 1983

Transport
Road verge, one of a number of terms for a vegetative strip beside the carriageway of a road
 Boulevard (Atlanta), a boulevard named "Boulevard"
 Arthur Ashe Boulevard, a historic street in Richmond, Virginia also referred to as "the Boulevard"
Bulevardi (English: Boulevard), a boulevard in Helsinki

Other uses
 Boulevard Shopping Centre, a shopping centre in Montreal
 The Boulevard (Amman), a pedestrian shopping street in Amman, Jordan
 Boulevard, California, unincorporated community in the United States
 Boulevards, internet city guide network company
 El Cajon Boulevard, major thoroughfare through San Diego, La Mesa and El Cajon, California and called "The Boulevard"
 Boulevard (restaurant), restaurant located in San Francisco, California
 The Boulevard (stadium), in Hull, England from 1895 to 2010
 Boulevard Brewing Company, in Kansas City, Missouri

See also
 BLVD (disambiguation)
 BD (disambiguation)